Diphenylphosphine oxide is an organophosphorus compound with the formula (C6H5)2P(O)H.  It is a  white solid that soluble in polar organic solvents.

Synthesis
Diphenylphosphine oxide can be prepared by the reaction of phosphonic esters, such as diethylphosphite, with Grignard reagents followed by acid workup:
(C2H5O)2P(O)H  +  3C6H5MgBr  →  (C6H5)2P(O)MgBr  +  C2H5OMgBr
(C6H5)2P(O)MgBr  +  HCl →  (C6H5)2P(O)H  + MgBrCl

Alternatively, it may be prepared by the partial hydrolysis of chlorodiphenylphosphine or diphenylphosphine.

Reactions
Diphenylphosphine oxide exists in equilibrium with its minor tautomer diphenylphosphinous acid, ((C6H5)2POH:

Diphenylphosphine oxide is used in Buchwald-Hartwig coupling reactions to introduce diphenylphosphino substituents.

Thionyl chloride converts diphenylphosphine oxide to chlorodiphenylphosphine.

Organophosphinous acids are deoxygenated with DIBAH.  The resulting secondary phosphines are precursors to phosphine ligands.

References

Organophosphine oxides
Phenyl compounds